"Ivan, Boris et moi" is a song by French singer Marie Laforêt. It initially appeared in 1967 on her EP titled Marie Laforêt vol. XIV  (also called Ivan, Boris et moi).

Composition 
The song was written by Émile Stern and Eddy Marnay.

Track listings 
7-inch EP Marie Laforêt vol. XIV (1967, Festival FX 1545)
A1. "Ivan, Boris et moi"
A2. "Je ne peux rien promettre"
B1. "Pour celui qui viendra"
B2. "Tom"

Charts 
"Ivan, Boris et moi" / "Tom"

Covers 
There are two Russian versions of this song, "Tri plus pyat'" (lit. "Three plus five"), adapted by Leonid Kukso and recorded by Alla Yoshpe, and "Anton, Ivan, Boris'", recorded by Edita Piekha.

References 

Marie Laforêt songs
1967 songs
1967 singles
Songs written by Eddy Marnay
Songs with music by Émile Stern